Donald Scott MacNutt (May 5, 1935 – September 13, 2010) was a Canadian politician. He represented the electoral district of Dartmouth South in the Nova Scotia House of Assembly from 1970 to 1974. He was a member of the Nova Scotia Liberal Party.

MacNutt was born in Digby, Nova Scotia. He attended St. Francis Xavier University and was a businessman. In 1961, he married Anna Dawn Reid. He died in September 2010.

MacNutt entered provincial politics in the 1970 election, defeating Progressive Conservative incumbent I. W. Akerley by 91 votes in Dartmouth South. On October 28, 1970, MacNutt was appointed to the Executive Council of Nova Scotia as Minister of Health. He was given an additional role in cabinet as Minister of Labour in September 1972. MacNutt was defeated by Roland J. Thornhill when he ran for re-election in the 1974 election. Prior to the 1998 election, MacNutt was a candidate for the Liberal nomination in his old Dartmouth South riding, but was defeated for the nomination by municipal politician Bruce Hetherington.

References

1935 births
2010 deaths
Members of the Executive Council of Nova Scotia
Nova Scotia Liberal Party MLAs
Nova Scotia Ministers of Health
People from Digby County, Nova Scotia
St. Francis Xavier University alumni